The  Honda CB250N and CB400N Super Dream are motorcycles manufactured by the Honda Motor Company from 1978 to 1986. The successor to the short lived Dream model, it had a series of revisions including a six-speed transmission and what Honda termed as European styling  which resembled the CB750F and CB900F. It was a popular  model for Honda with 70,000 bikes sold in the UK alone.

Engine 

The Super Dream was fitted with a four stroke, air-cooled, twin-cylinder engine. It had three valves per cylinder, two inlet and one exhaust, operated by a chain-driven overhead camshaft. Ignition was provided by capacitor discharge ignition (CDI). It had a 360° crank layout similar to many traditional British parallel twins, but with two balance shafts to reduce unwanted vibrations. It used a six-speed transmission and chain final drive. Fuelling was provided by twin Keihin carburettors.

CB250N 
The CB250N Super Dream was a  motorbike. It was a popular model in the United Kingdom due to the licensing laws at the time allowing learners to ride any motorbike with a capacity under 250cc. The CB250N was the most popular selling bike in the UK with over 17000 bikes sold in 1980 alone.

During its production run it had several variations from 1978 to 1986. The various designations were, CB250N (1978–1979), CB250NA (1980), CB250NB/NDB Deluxe (1981) and CB250NDC (1982–1985) and CB250NDD (1983–1986).

CB400N 
The CB400N Super Dream was very similar to the 250N variant. However, it differed from the 250N with its larger engine capacity, twin front brake discs and a halogen front head light. The instrumentation had different markings for the rev counter and speedometer to reflect the higher top speed and lower RPM redline.

The CB400N had several revisions during its production run. The launch model CB400N (1979–1980), CB400NA (1980–1981), CB400NB (1981–1983), CB400NC (1982–1985) and CB400ND (1983–1986).

References 

 

CB250N
Standard motorcycles
Motorcycles introduced in 1978
Motorcycles powered by straight-twin engines